Frank Dunlop (1913-1991) was a Scottish professional football right-half who played for Aberdeen.

Playing career

Dunlop was born in Glasgow and signed for Aberdeen from Junior club Benburb in 1936. Dunlop captained Aberdeen in the 1947 Scottish Cup Final, which Aberdeen won 2–1 against Hibernian.

Retirement

Dunlop retired to South Africa in 1948.  He was manager of the Southern Rhodesia team which won the Currie Cup in 1959. He later returned to Aberdeen.

Honours

 Aberdeen
 Scottish Cup: 1947

References

Footballers from Glasgow
Association football wing halves
Aberdeen F.C. players
Scottish Football League players
Benburb F.C. players
1991 deaths
1913 births
Scottish footballers